The ACE Yewt is an electric light commercial vehicle (A-segment), produced by the ACE EV Group since 2021.

History
Two years after its foundation, the ACE EV Group introduced its future range of electric cars, including a small pickup truck called the ACE Yewt. Characterized by a curvilinear silhouette, the vehicle was developed with the use of an aluminum frame and lightweight plastics reinforced with carbon fiber. 

In addition to the Yewt, the ACE EV Group also introduced a panel van variant called the ACE Cargo. The van was characterized by a high roof line, which suddenly lowered at the height of the two-person passenger compartment. 

Both the Yewt and Cargo were delivered in October 2021 for production in Adelaide, South Australia, reaching local buyers in the following year. The main targets are small entrepreneurs in large Australian metropolises.

Specifications

References

Cars of Australia
Electric vans
Pickup trucks
All-wheel-drive vehicles
Upcoming car models